Club Balonmano Ramón y Cajal is a Spanish multi-sports club based in the autonomous city of Ceuta. Founded in 2003, their football team plays in Regional Preferente de Ceuta, holding home games at Estadio José Martínez Pirri, with a capacity of 1,000 people.

Season to season

References

External links
Soccerway team profile

Football clubs in Ceuta
Association football clubs established in 2003
2003 establishments in Spain